Nagen Saikia (born 11 February 1939) is an Indian writer. He was formerly a professor of Dibrugarh University. Saikia had also been a member of the Rajya Sabha from 1986-1992 and was the vice-chairman of the Upper House from 1990-1992. Saikia started his career as a teacher and went on to serve in different reputed institutions in various categories. He also delivered lectures on various topics about Assamese literature, including in the US and England. He has published numerous literary essays, short stories, novels, books and articles, to his credit. Saikia was conferred with the Sahitya Akademi award in 1997 for his short stories collection Andharat Nizar Mukh and was honoured by the Mohan Chandra Sahitya Sabha in 1980 for Chinta aru Charcha. He was conferred the Sahitya Akademi Fellowship, the highest honour conferred by the Sahitya Akademi on the most distinguished Indian writers.

Early life
Saikia was born in 1939 Hatiakhowa to Umaram Saikia and Hemaprabha Saikia, Golaghat district of Assam. He started his primary education in Borkathoni L.P. school and later went to Kakodonga M.E. School. He passed his matriculation from Dhekial H. E. School in 1957 securing first division. In 1959 he passed his I. A. (Higher Secondary) from Jagannath Barooah College, Jorhat. He was graduated from Debraj Roy College, Golaghat in 1961. He had done his Post- Graduation in Assamese (Literature) from Gauhati University, Guwahati in 1964. He did his Ph. D. from Dibrugarh University in 1982 under the supervision of Mahendra Borah for his thesis A Critical Study of the Social and Intellectual Background of Modern Assamese Literature 1826-1903.

Career
Nagen Saikia started his professional career as a teacher in Hatiakhowa H.E. School and Dhekial H. E. School from 1959 to 1965. He served as an Assistant Editor in Asom Batori in 1965. From 1965 to 1971 Nagen Saikia served as a lecturer in Assamese in the Diphu Government College, Jorhat College and the Devicharan Barua Girls' College. In 1972 he joined as a lecturer in the department of Assamese in Dibrugarh University and continued till 1986. During this period he also served as a Secretary of the Co- Ordination Committee for publication of Text books in Assamese, Dibrugarh University. Saikia had also been a member of the Rajya Sabha from 1986-1992 and was the vice-chairman of the Upper House from 1990-1992.
In 1992 Saikia joined as Professor of the Lakshminath Bezbaroa chair in the department of Assamese in Dibrugarh University. He was an editor of Natun Dainik, an Assamese daily in 2003 and Amar Asom in 2004-06.

Travelled Abroad of Dr. Saikia
 Being invited as the Guest Speaker, delivered lectures on ‘Contributions of American Baptist Missionaries towards the Development of Modern Assamese Literature, in the United States in 1988, under the auspices of Assam Association of North America.
 Travelled China as a member of the Five-Member-Delegation of Indian Writers, in 1993, organised by Sahitya Akademi.
 Travelled England to deliver Lectures on Sankardeva in the month of October (1998).

Honorary Office :
 General Secretary, Asam Sahitya Sabha (1973-1976, 1980-1985)
 Member, (in different times) Executive Committee, Book Selection Committee, Jatiya Nyas Samiti, Editorial Board of The Patrika, Literary Award Committees, Committee for plan and Programmes etc. of Assam Sahitya Sabha.
 Member, (in different times) General Body, Executive Committee, Encyclopedia Committee, Award Committee, Book Planning Committee, Administrative Reform Committee etc. of the Publication Board, Assam.
 Member, Assamese Advisory Board, Sahitya Akademi (1975-1985, 1993-1998, 2003-2008)
 Member, General Council, Sahitya Akademi (1993-1998)
 Member, Authors’ Guild of India (1974)
 Member-Convenor, Assamese Bhasa Samiti, Saraswati Samman, New Delhi (1991-1994).
 Member, Court of the North-Eastern Hill University, Shillong (1989-1992).
 Member, Chayan Parishad, Saraswati Samman (1993-1996)
 Member, Advisory Committee, Tai Language Course, Dibrugarh University (1992-2003).
 Member, Executive Council & Court Dibrugarh University and thereby member in other Committees.
 Member, Editorial Board, Prakas (Assamese Monthly) (1990-1992).
 Member, Editorial Board ‘Samjna’ (Assamese Monthly) (1975-1978).
 Editor, Sampratik, Poetry Magazine (1971).
 Chief Editor, Brahmaputra (for a short time) Assamese monthly (1985).
 President, Natakam, a Theatre Group (1966-1968) Jorhat, Assam.
 Member, Advisory Committee to the Education Minister, Assam (1986-1990).
 Member, State Advisory Committee for preservation of Cultural Identity (1986-1990).
 Member, Advisory Board of Implementation of Educational Scheme for Tea Garden Population of Assam (1986-1990).
 Vice-Chairman, State Level National Integration Council (1987-1990)
 Member, State Planning Board, Assam (1987-1990; 1998)
 Member, General Body, Srimanta Sankardev Kalakshetra (1987-1990, 1996-1999).
 Member, State Committee for Production of Text Books (1981-1983).
 Member, Governing Body of the North East Zone Cultural Centre (186-1990).
 Different Committees of the Parliament (1986-1992).
 Member, Panel of Vice-Chairman, Rajya Sabha (1990-1992).
 Member, (President of India’s Nominee) of the Planning and Academic Committee, Tezpur University (1999-2004).
 Member, State Planning Board, Assam (1996-2000).
 Member, Governing Body, Eastern Zonal Cultural Centre, Kolkata, (1998-2002).
 Member, General Council of Anundaram Barooah Institute of Language, Art & Culture. (1996-1999).
 Editor, Uttarayan, an Assamese Literary Monthly 2000-2001.
 Member, Selection of Vice-Chancellor for Dibrugarh University (1992 & 1997)
 Subject Expert, Assamese (National Level).
 Member, Executive Committee of Comparative Literature Association of India.
 President, Sankari Sangeet Vidyapeeth (1997).
 Member, (Govt. of Assam Nominee) High Powered Committee, Literary and Culture Pensions (1997-2000).
  Member, Srimanta Sankardeva Award Selection Committee (1995-2000).
 Member, Expert Committee for Selection of Newspapers and Peridicals for Preservation in the Library, Kolkata (2003-2004).
 Jury Member of a few State and National Level Literary Awards.
 Member, International Comparative Literature Association.
 Member, Council for Development of Indian Languages, Govt. of India.

Awards
 Mohan Chandra Sarma Award, 1980
 President, Literary Section, Sreemanta Sankaradeva Sangha, Dergaon Session, 1976
 Sahitya Akademi Award, 1997 for Short-story Collection Andharat Nijar Mukh
 Title Vidya-Nidhi, 1998 conferred by the International Buddhist Brotherhood Mission
 Assam Valley Literary Award, 2007 for total Literary Contribution.
 Hariprasad Rai Award, 2008.
 K. K. Handiqui Memorial Literary Award, 2009.
 Jagadhatri Haramohan Award, 2010.
 Sabda Sahitya Award, 2013	
 People of the Year 2015 by Limca Book of Records, 2015
 D.Litt. by Dibrugarh University in 2016
 ERDF Excellence Award-2015 by ERD Foundation (University of Science and Technology, Meghalaya)

Works
Fiction: 
 Kuber Hati Barua(A collection of Short-stories), 1967
 Chabi Aru Frame(A collection of Short-stories), 1969
 Bandha Kothat Dhumuha (A collection of Short-stories), 1971
 Matir Chakir Jui (A collection of Short-stories), 1976
 Astitvar Sikali (A collection of Short-stories), 1976
 Aparthiva-Parthiva (A collection of Short-stories), 1982
 Andharat Nizar Mukh (A collection of Short-stories), 1995
 Bhagna Upakul (Novel), 1983
 Amerikat Dahdin (Travelogue), 1988
 Maha Chinar Dinlipi (Travelogue), 1994
 Swapna aru Smriti and Dhulir Dhemali (Autobiographies), 2002
 Hemanta Kalar Ati Gadhulit, (A collection of Short-Stories), 2001

 Verses:
 Mita-Bhas ( A collection of short expressions, A new literary genre introduced by the author), 1995
 Swapna-Smriti-Visad (A collection of Mita-Bhas), 1997

Non-fiction:
 Background of Modern Assamese Literature, 1988
 Chinta Aru Charcha, 1980
 Unabimsa Satikar AsamiyaBhasar Samkat, 1988
 Bharatar Samskritik Aitijya aru Anyanya Rachana, 1993
 Agnigarbha Asam, 1993
 Asamiya Kabita aru Anyanya Bisay, 1996
 Gavesana-Padhati-Parichaya (A Book on Research Methodology in Assamese), 1996
 Tulanamulak Sahitya-Bichar (A book on Comparative Literature), 1996
 Sambadikata: Eti Gadhur aru Pavitra Dayitva, 2000
 Unavimsa Satikar Asam: Andhar aru Pohar, 2002?
 Ejan Santa Tantir Jevan-Kahini (Monograph on Kavir), 2001
 Byaktitvar Bhaskarayya
 Asamiya Varnamala, 2001
 Sahitya Badabaichitrya, 2003
 Maheswar Neog (Monograph)
 Anandachandra Baruah (Monograph)
 Sankardeva (Monograph)
 Asamiya Manuhar Itishas, 2013

References 

Indian male novelists
1939 births
Living people
Recipients of the Assam Valley Literary Award
Writers from Assam
People from Golaghat district
Recipients of the Sahitya Akademi Award in Assamese
Indian male short story writers
Indian male essayists
20th-century Indian novelists
20th-century Indian short story writers
20th-century Indian essayists
20th-century Indian male writers